Darren Peter John Flint (born 14 June 1970 in Basingstoke, Hampshire) is a retired English cricketer. Flint was a right-handed batsman who was a slow left-arm orthodox bowler.

Flint signed for Hampshire in 1990, making his first-class debut in 1993 against Gloucestershire taking five wickets in an innings on debut and seven in the match.

Over the next two seasons Flint played fifteen games for Hampshire, playing his final match for the club in 1995 against Worcestershire. Flint played predominantly as a bowler, bowling slow left-arm orthodox spin. His bowling yielded 34 wickets at an average of 38.76, with one five wicket haul of 5/32.

Flint was released by Hampshire at the end of the 1995 County Championship season after suffering a debilitating injury.

Flint is now a member of the coaching staff at Hampshire cricket. He is the lead spin bowling coach, overseeing the development of spin bowling up to and including the professional squad.

External links

Darren Flint at Cricinfo
Darren Flint at CricketArchive
Matches and detailed statistics for Darren Flint at CricketArchive

1970 births
Living people
Cricketers from Basingstoke
English cricketers
Hampshire cricketers
Wiltshire cricketers